The 2013–14 Saudi Crown Prince Cup was the 39th season of the Saudi Crown Prince Cup since its establishment in 1957. This season's competition featured a total of 30 teams, 14 teams from the Pro League, and 16 teams from the First Division. For the first time, the Crown Prince Cup tournament was contested by 30 teams, having been expanded from the 16-team format used since 1991. Under the new format, last season's finalists received a bye to the Round of 16 while the remaining 28 teams entered at the preliminary stage.

Al-Hilal were the six-time defending champions, but lost in the final against Al-Nassr, who won their third Crown Prince Cup title and first since 1974.

Format changes
On 1 June 2013, the Saudi Arabian Football Federation announced changes in the format of the cup competitions in Saudi Arabia. As per the new regulations, the number of teams in the King Cup was increased from 8 teams to 32 teams. In addition, the competition was open to all 153 Saudi teams, 30 teams from the Pro League and First Division would qualify directly to the Round of 32, and 2 teams would qualify from the qualifying stages. The Saudi FF also announced changes to the format of the Crown Prince Cup. These changes included an increase in the number of teams. The competition was open to all professional clubs in the top 2 tiers of Saudi football (the Pro League and the First Division). Under this new format, the finalists from the previous season will receive a bye to the Round of 16 while the remaining 28 teams enter at the preliminary round.

First stage

Preliminary round
The Preliminary round fixtures were played on 25 November and 2 & 3 December 2013. All times are local, AST (UTC+3).

Second stage

Bracket

Note:     H: Home team,   A: Away team

Round of 16
The Round of 16 fixtures were played on 10 & 16 December 2013. The Al-Raed v Al-Wehda match was postponed due to flight conditions. All times are local, AST (UTC+3).

Quarter-finals
The Quarter-finals fixtures were played on 23 & 24 December 2013. All times are local, AST (UTC+3).

Semi-finals
The Semi-finals fixtures were played on 21 January 2014. All times are local, AST (UTC+3).

Final

The final was held on 1 February 2014 in the King Fahd International Stadium in Riyadh. All times are local, AST (UTC+3).

Top goalscorers
As of 1 February 2014

References

Saudi Crown Prince Cup seasons
2013–14 domestic association football cups
Crown Prince Cup